Love in a Bungalow is a 1937 American comedy film directed by Ray McCarey and written by Austin Parker, Karen DeWolf and James Mulhauser. The film stars Nan Grey, Kent Taylor, Louise Beavers, J. Scott Smart, Minerva Urecal and Hobart Cavanaugh. The film was released on June 27, 1937, by Universal Pictures.

Plot
One day Mary Callahan finds a man that has slept in a bungalow she is trying to sell, a few days later he appears again seeking shelter from the rain, she lets him in and they listen to radio while the storm doesn't end. The radio station has a contest for the best letter explaining a couple's love, so they pretend to be married and send a letter.

Cast
Nan Grey as Mary Callahan
Kent Taylor as Jeff Langan
Louise Beavers as Millie
J. Scott Smart as Wilbur Babcock
Minerva Urecal as Mrs. Kester
Hobart Cavanaugh as Mr. Kester
Richard Carle as Mr. Bisbee
Marjorie Main as Miss Emma Bisbee
Margaret McWade as Miss Lydia Bisbee
Robert Spencer as Tracy
Arthur Hoyt as A man
Florence Lake as The 'Ga-Ga' Prospect
Armand 'Curly' Wright as Janitor
Dell Henderson as Manager
Otto Fries as Policeman
William "Billy" Benedict as Telegraph boy
Sherry Hall as Clerk in Bisbee's Office
Edward Earle as Clerk in Bisbee's Office
Arthur Yeoman as Clerk in Bisbee's Office
James T. Mack as Clerk in Bisbee's Office
John Iven as Clerk in Bisbee's Office
Burr Caruth as Clerk in Bisbee's Office
Bobby Watson as Barker
Henry Roquemore as James
Stanley Blystone as Policeman
Betty Mack as Girl

References

External links
 

1937 films
American comedy films
1937 comedy films
Universal Pictures films
Films directed by Ray McCarey
American black-and-white films
1930s English-language films
1930s American films